Patrik Džalto (born 19 February 1997) is a Croatian footballer who plays as a forward for Bregalnica Štip.

Club career
In summer 2016, Džalto joined Jahn Regensburg on loan from Bayer Leverkusen for the 2016–17 season. In June 2017, he signed permanently, agreeing to a one-year contract. In January 2018, he joined TuS Koblenz.

In the beginning of 2020, Džalto joined Croatian club HNK Vukovar '91.

References

External links
 

1997 births
Living people
People from Reutlingen
Sportspeople from Tübingen (region)
Footballers from Baden-Württemberg
German people of Croatian descent
Association football forwards
German footballers
Croatian footballers
Croatia youth international footballers
Bayer 04 Leverkusen players
SSV Jahn Regensburg players
TuS Koblenz players
FC Memmingen players
SK Austria Klagenfurt players
HNK Vukovar '91 players
FK Bregalnica Štip players
3. Liga players
Regionalliga players
2. Liga (Austria) players
Macedonian First Football League players
Croatian expatriate footballers
German expatriate footballers
Croatian expatriate sportspeople in Austria
German expatriate sportspeople in Austria
Expatriate footballers in Austria
Croatian expatriate sportspeople in North Macedonia
German expatriate sportspeople in North Macedonia
Expatriate footballers in North Macedonia